Football Manager 2012 (abbreviated to FM12) is a football management-simulation video game. It was released on Microsoft Windows and Mac OS X on 21 October 2011. FM12 is the eighth game in the Football Manager series.

Gameplay
FM12 features similar gameplay to that of the Football Manager series. Gameplay consists of taking charge of a professional association football team, as the team manager. Players can sign football players to contracts, manage finances for the club, and give team talks to players. FM12 is a simulation of real world management, with the player being judged on various factors by the club's AI owners and board.

FM12 added increased levels of scouting, including the amount of information a scout would bring back for in-game players. The largest new addition to the game was the ability to add or remove playable leagues from the game at the end of every season.

Release
A demo of the game was released on Steam in association with Sky Sports HD on 6 October 2011. It provides half of a season of game play, which can be continued within the full purchased version. The demo is limited to only the leagues of England, Scotland, France, Spain, Holland, Belgium, Italy, Norway, Denmark, Sweden and Australia, playable as quick-starts.

Digital rights management

Football Manager 2012 is the first in the series to require the use of Steam software; this angered many thousands of fans of the series. The move means that users must activate the game online before they are able to play. Sega indicated that the change was intended to reduce piracy.

Reception

According to media review aggregator website Metacritic, Football Manager 2012 received "generally positive reviews". In particular GameSpot said that the "ability to turn leagues off and on was a great addition". The German website 4players.de rated the game with 88% as "sehr gut" ("very good").

References

External links 
 

2011 video games
2012
Games for Windows certified games
Video games developed in the United Kingdom
Windows games
MacOS games
IOS games
Android (operating system) games
PlayStation Portable games
La Liga licensed video games